Gongye 4th Road Station, is a station of Line 4 of Wuhan Metro. It entered revenue service on December 28, 2013. It is located in Hongshan District.

Station layout

References

Wuhan Metro stations
Line 4, Wuhan Metro
Railway stations in China opened in 2013